Joseph Anthony Gormley (born 26 November 1989) is a Northern Irish footballer who plays for Cliftonville in the NIFL Premiership. Gormley played for amateur side Crumlin Star, before making the move to Cliftonville. On 14 June 2015, Gormley made the transition to professional football, signing for Football League One side Peterborough United. After suffering a serious knee injury, Gormley moved on loan to Scottish club St Johnstone in August 2016. After becoming "disillusioned" with professional football, Gormley cancelled his contracts with Peterborough and St Johnstone. After much speculation, it was announced in January 2017 that Gormley would rejoin Cliftonville for the 2017/18 season.

Club career

Early career
Gormley began his career at Cliftonville, making four appearances before being released in 2009. He joined Crumlin Star, where he scored 61 goals in the 2010–11 season before re-joining Cliftonville in 2011.

Cliftonville
He was top goalscorer in Northern Ireland in 2013–14, when he became the first player in the club's history to score over 30 goals in two separate seasons, and was named as Ulster Footballer of the Year and Northern Ireland Football Writers' Player of the Year for 2013–14.
He holds the club record for most goals scored in a domestic season in a Cliftonville shirt, amounting 41 in the season of 2014–15; breaking his own previous record of 37 goals the season before.

Peterborough United
On 14 June 2015, it was confirmed that Peterborough United had signed Gormley on a three-year deal, and he would officially join the club on 1 July 2015.

On 25 September 2015 he was sidelined for the rest of the season by a serious knee injury. Gormley was loaned to Scottish club St Johnstone in August 2016. After two months with St Johnstone, Gormley became "disillusioned with football" and decided to return to his native Northern Ireland. Gormley, Peterborough and St Johnstone applied to FIFA for permission to cancel his contracts outside the normal transfer windows.

Career statistics
Correct as of 28 January 2020.

Honours
Cliftonville
NIFL Premiership (2): 2012–13, 2013–14
Irish League Cup (4): 2012–13, 2013–14, 2014–15, 2021-22
County Antrim Shield (3): 2011–12, 2014–15, 2019–20

Individual awards
Ulster Footballer of the Year (1): 2013–14
Northern Ireland Football Writers' Association Player of the Year (1): 2013–14

References

1989 births
Living people
Association footballers from Northern Ireland
Cliftonville F.C. players
Peterborough United F.C. players
NIFL Premiership players
Ulster Footballers of the Year
Northern Ireland Football Writers' Association Players of the Year
Association footballers from Belfast
St Johnstone F.C. players
English Football League players
Scottish Professional Football League players
Association football forwards